Sigleif Johansen (born October 25, 1948 in Tana) is a former Norwegian biathlete. He received a silver medal in the 20 km individual at the World Championships in 1977 in Lillehammer, and a bronze medal in Ruhpolding in 1979. He received a silver medal in the 4 × 7.5 km relay in 1978.

References

1948 births
Living people
People from Tana, Norway
Norwegian male biathletes
Olympic biathletes of Norway
Biathletes at the 1980 Winter Olympics
Biathlon World Championships medalists
Sportspeople from Troms og Finnmark